Cambodia participated at the 2018 Asian Para Games which was held in Jakarta, Indonesia from 6 to 13 October 2018. Cambodia's delegation consisted of 29 athletes, 11 coaches and three advisers and administrators from the Cambodian Ministry of Education, Youth and Sport; larger than the previous two edition of the games.

See also
 Cambodia at the 2018 Asian Games

References

 
2018
Nations at the 2018 Asian Para Games
2018 in Cambodian sport